Little Falls is a census-designated place (CDP) in the town of Gorham in Cumberland County, Maine, United States. The population of the CDP was 708 at the 2010 census. Prior to 2010, Little Falls was part of the Little Falls-South Windham census-designated place.

It is part of the Portland–South Portland–Biddeford, Maine Metropolitan Statistical Area.

Geography

The CDP of South Windham is located directly across the Presumpscot River, in the town of Windham.  U.S. Route 202 and Maine State Route 4 run north-south in a concurrency through both communities.

Demographics

References

Census-designated places in Maine
Portland metropolitan area, Maine